Thomas Curtis Clarke (September 16, 1827 – June 15, 1901) was a railway engineer, builder and author best known for a series of cast iron bridges in the United States. While living and working in Port Hope, Ontario, his firm won the contract to build the east and west blocks of the Canadian Houses of Parliament.

Life
Clarke was born in Newton, Massachusetts on September 16, 1827 and as a boy he attended the Boston Latin School. He enrolled at Harvard University, graduating in 1848 with a Bachelor of Arts degree in engineering, working under Captain John Child.

In 1873, Clarke was elected as a member to the American Philosophical Society.

Thomas Curtis Clarke died in New York City on June 15, 1901, and is buried in Port Hope, Ontario, Canada.

References

Further reading

 Thomas Curtis Clarke et al., The American Railway: Its Construction, Development, Management and Appliances, Charles Scribner's Sones, 1889
"Who Was T.C. Clarke, C.E.", SSAC Bulletin, Vol. 17, No. 4, December 1992, Journal of the Society for the Study of Architecture in Canada (SSAC), Ottawa, Ontario, Canada. (article by Jim Leonard; this research provided the impetus, in 1993, for the Ontario Heritage Trust to erect a "blue and gold" provincial heritage plaque in downtown Port Hope.)

1827 births
1901 deaths
Civil engineering contractors
Harvard School of Engineering and Applied Sciences alumni